Philip Lord (born July 12, 1975) and Christopher Miller (born September 23, 1975) are an American filmmaking duo. They created the adult animated sitcom Clone High (2002–2003), directed and wrote the animated films Cloudy with a Chance of Meatballs (2009) and The Lego Movie (2014), as well as directing the live-action comedy film 21 Jump Street (2012) and its sequel, 22 Jump Street (2014). Lord and Miller won the Academy Award for Best Animated Feature as producers of Spider-Man: Into the Spider-Verse (2018), which was co-written by Lord, and co-produced the television series The Last Man on Earth (2015–2018) for Fox and Unikitty! (2017–2020) for Cartoon Network.

Early life
Lord is from Miami; his mother is a Cuban-born psychologist, and his father retired from the aviation business and before that directed a dance company, Fusion, for 10 years. Miller is from the Seattle area, where his father runs a lumber mill.

Lord and Miller both grew up making short films with an affinity for animation. They attended Dartmouth College, and had separate comics in the school newspaper The Dartmouth. Lord was a member of Amarna, a co-ed undergraduate society while Miller was a brother at Alpha Chi Alpha. During his time in college, Miller met his girlfriend, now wife.

During their time at Dartmouth, the school paper published a profile on Miller, which caught the attention of Michael Eisner, then chairman of Disney. According to Lord, Eisner brought the profile to the attention of his fellow Disney executives who offered to set up a meeting with Miller. Miller agreed to the meeting as long as he could bring Lord. After three months, the two moved to Los Angeles and after one meeting were offered a two-year development deal at Walt Disney Television Animation.

Career

2000s
Though nothing they pitched made it to air, they produced the pilot to Clone High, which was subsequently dropped by Fox. After they wrote and produced on a series of sitcoms, MTV informed the duo that they were interested in purchasing a 13-episode season of Clone High. Although the show was met with acclaim, MTV canceled the series after hunger strike protests occurred in India over the show's portrayal of Gandhi as a motor-mouthed partier.

In 2003, the two were tapped to write a screenplay for Cloudy with a Chance of Meatballs, their first feature film. After a year working on the script, they were fired for story issues and replaced with new writers, who after a year were fired themselves. Lord and Miller were re-hired in 2006. The two completely redid the script, this time with the creative input of their crew. The new draft had the protagonist as a failed inventor who wanted to prove himself to his town. The two were almost fired again after Amy Pascal, the head of Sony Pictures at the time, criticized the film for a lack of story. Although the film succeeded on the comedic front in the animatic stage, Pascal cited the lack of an anchoring relationship in the film as a failure in the story telling. Unable to create new characters and environments to suit the new story demands, the two elevated the character of the tackle shop extra to be the protagonist's father, thereby creating the relationship Pascal had requested. The pair's experience on Cloudy with a Chance of Meatballs taught them two valuable lessons: the power of creative collaboration and the importance of emotion in a story.

Cloudy with a Chance of Meatballs was released in 2009 to positive reviews.

2010s

After Cloudy with a Chance of Meatballs was released, the two sought to try to make something different and pitched themselves as possible directors for the 21 Jump Street script that Michael Bacall and Jonah Hill had written. The studio agreed and the two directed their first live-action R-rated film, released to critical acclaim, which led to the production of the sequel 22 Jump Street.

In an interview with Robert K. Elder for his book The Best Film You've Never Seen, Lord stated that "in an animated feature, you remake the movie three or four times, and it's really easy to get bummed out that the way you did it before didn't get greenlit, didn't get paid, and you're making a totally different version of that movie."

During the production of 21 Jump Street, they pitched a take on a possible Lego film to Dan Lin. Lin and Warner Bros. loved the take, so Lord and Miller wrote and eventually directed their third feature film together, The Lego Movie. The duo were picked by Warner Bros. to write the script for the upcoming superhero film The Flash. The duo were picked by Sony Pictures Animation in 2015 to create an animated Spider-Man film, with the option to direct. The film was eventually made as Spider-Man: Into the Spider-Verse (2018), which the duo produced and which Lord co-wrote.

The duo have developed a live-action/animated series, Son of Zorn, for Fox, with Jason Sudeikis voicing the lead role of animated character Zorn, and Johnny Pemberton and Cheryl Hines playing the live-action roles. They are producing a cable-TV drama based on the popular NPR/This American Life spinoff podcast Serial.

Also, they produced an R-rated animated Netflix original film called America: The Motion Picture alongside Will Allegra, Matt Thompson, Adam Reed, Channing Tatum, Reid Carolin and Peter Kiernan from a screenplay by David Callaham and directed by Thompson.

In January 2017, Lord and Miller began directing the then-untitled film Solo: A Star Wars Story, a standalone Star Wars movie based on the Han Solo character. On June 20, 2017 it was reported that they had been fired from the project by Lucasfilm, after over four-and-a-half months of filming, about three-quarters through principal photography. Lucasfilm announced that "creative differences" were the reason, with Entertainment Weekly reporting that Lord and Miller were going off-script and trying to make the film into more of a comedy. They were unwilling to compromise with Lucasfilm and writer Lawrence Kasdan on the direction of the film, preferring their vision. Two days later, Ron Howard was announced as the replacement, to complete the film and reshoots. Lord and Miller received executive-producer credits on Solo: A Star Wars Story.

In November 2017, Lord and Miller commented on their departure from Solo: A Star Wars Story. Lord stated "The experience of shooting the movie was wonderful. We had the most incredible cast and crew and collaborators. [...] We're really proud of the work we did on the movie and we wish everybody the best." Miller added "As Phil said, we had such a great relationship with cast and crew, we were really rooting for them. After we took a much-needed vacation, we got back into it and now we're writing and producing a sequel to The Lego Movie and producing a Miles Morales animated Spider-Man."

2020s-present
Lord and Miller produced The Mitchells vs. the Machines for Sony Pictures Animation. 

In June 2020, it was reported that Lord and Miller would be developing an eight-episode television series titled The Afterparty for Apple TV+. The series is a murder mystery comedy set at a high school reunion where each episode features a retelling of the same night told through a different character's point of view. Miller created and directed the series, while serving as an executive producer alongside Lord. The series premiered on January 28, 2022, to critical acclaim.

On November 1, 2019, it was announced that Lord and Miller would be returning as producers and writers for Spider-Man: Across the Spider-Verse, which is set to be released on June 2, 2023.  In December 2021, Lord and Miller revealed that Across the Spider-Verse was being split into two parts after they had written down the story they wanted to tell for the sequel and realized that it was too much for a single film. Work on both parts was taking place simultaneously, with Part Two, since renamed to Spider-Man: Beyond the Spider-Verse, set to be released on March 29, 2024.

On July 2, 2020, it was announced that MTV Studios was developing a reboot of Clone High, and that original series creators, Lord, Miller, and Bill Lawrence would be involved with the project. In February 2021, the series was given a two season order by HBO Max.

Future projects
In September 2017, Lord and Miller were announced as co-directors of the film adaptation of the 2017 novel Artemis. However, due to the Disney-Fox merger and producer Simon Kinberg ending his deal with the company, the fate of the project is unknown.

On May 15, 2020, Variety reported that Lord and Miller are attached to direct a film adaptation of Andy Weir's next novel Project Hail Mary for MGM, with Ryan Gosling attached to star in the leading role and Amy Pascal producing.

In May 2021, it was announced that Lord and Miller would produce and direct an adaptation of the book The Premonition: A Pandemic Story, which chronicles the early days of the COVID-19 pandemic.

They made a five-year deal with Sony Pictures Television to develop an animated Marvel series, including a possible Into the Spider-Verse series, as well as a first-look deal with Universal Pictures. 

In an interview with /Film during promotion of The Afterparty, Lord and Miller expressed interest in making a biopic of Hall & Oates.

Other projects
Lord co-wrote the comic Spider-Man Annual #1, marking his first involvement on a comic book; he and Miller also co-wrote a Marvel comic celebrating the company's 80th anniversary, marking Miller's first time writing a comic book. 

In September 2020, it was announced that a live-action television series based on the character Silk was in development, with both Lord and Miller serving as executive producers alongside Amy Pascal.

Filmography

Films

Producer only

Other credits

Television

Acting credits

Accolades

See also
 Phil Lord and Christopher Miller's unrealized projects

References

External links

 
 

American television writers
American television producers
American male screenwriters
American animated film directors
American animated film producers
American male voice actors
Annie Award winners
Dartmouth College alumni
Living people
Filmmaking duos
Film directors from Florida
Film directors from Washington (state)
Film producers from Florida
Film producers from Washington (state)
Screenwriting duos
Screenwriters from Florida
Screenwriters from Washington (state)
Sony Pictures Animation people
Warner Bros. Animation people
1975 births
American television directors
Animation duos
Animation screenwriters
Male actors from Florida
Male actors from Washington (state)
American male television writers
Producers who won the Best Animated Feature Academy Award
American voice directors
Animators from Florida
Postmodernist filmmakers
Hugo Award-winning writers
Nebula Award winners